WTWC-TV (channel 40) is a television station in Tallahassee, Florida, United States, affiliated with  NBC and Fox. Owned by Sinclair Broadcast Group, the station maintains studios on Deerlake South in unincorporated Leon County, Florida, northwest of Bradfordville (with a Tallahassee postal address), and its transmitter is located in unincorporated Thomas County, Georgia, southeast of Metcalf, along the Florida state line.

Sinclair also provides some engineering functions for Bainbridge, Georgia–licensed Heroes & Icons outlet WTLH, channel 49 (owned by New Age Media) and CW affiliate WTLF, channel 24 (owned by MPS Media and operated by New Age Media under a local marketing agreement (LMA)). WTLF and WTLH share separate facilities on Commerce Boulevard in Midway, Florida; master control and some internal operations for the two stations are based at WTWC-TV's studios.

WTWC-TV was the third commercial television station built in Tallahassee. Technical and financial battles dominated its first 13 years on air, including a malfunction with the station's tower that contributed to a four-year-long bankruptcy proceeding in the 1990s. It has made two attempts at producing local news, neither of which lasted more than several years.

History
Vencap Communications of Chattanooga, Tennessee, made an application in August 1980 to build a new television station on channel 40 in Tallahassee, which would be the region's third commercial outlet. Their bid attracted three competitors: JGM, Inc. and Holt-Robinson Television, which both proposed commercial independent stations, and Octagon Corporation, proposing a rebroadcaster of its WMBB-TV, then the NBC affiliate in Panama City.

The Federal Communications Commission (FCC) gave Holt-Robinson the nod in early 1982. The company obtained an affiliation with NBC; after weather foiled a scheduled October startup, Holt-Robinson planned a launch date of January 30, 1983, coinciding with NBC's telecast of Super Bowl XVII. However, that plan was dashed during construction of the station's tower. In designing the  mast, the contractor failed to account for the construction crane necessary to hoist the  antenna into place, and the tower twisted when the antenna was being mounted. To fix the damage, the top  of the tower had to be replaced.

This work was completed by April, and WTWC-TV finally made its debut on April 21, 1983, using a temporary antenna. For the first time since 1957, NBC had an affiliate in Tallahassee, where viewers had previously depended on WMBB (later WJHG) and WALB in Albany, Georgia. The tower problems were later credited by Holt-Robinson as having prevented it from going forward with plans to build a second station in Marshall, Texas.

Holt-Robinson's financial condition was tested during its time running WTWC-TV. The station faced a steep uphill climb against a dominant WCTV, the only commercial VHF station in the market, and WECA-TV channel 27, the ABC outlet. In 1986, the company had to agree to payment plans with a group of 11 program syndicators and faced trouble finding lenders, though the firm was able to refinance. There were other problems, most notably in 1988 when the FCC ordered the station to provide reports on its affirmative action program. The station's condition was such that its call letters were said to mean "We're Tallahassee's Worst Channel".

In a sign of what was to come, in August 1991, Paramount Television sued WTWC-TV for broadcasting Cheers after having the rights revoked for nonpayment. The next year, Holt-Robinson and WTWC filed for Chapter 11 bankruptcy protection; they had been forced to do so because one of the company's lenders, Greyhound Television, had asked in federal court for the appointment of a receiver, and the station owed some $600,000 to program producers and news services. Bankruptcy proceedings for Holt-Robinson and Holt-owned properties in Hattiesburg, Mississippi, stretched on more than two years; in the latter, WTWC-TV was cited as a drain on Holt's finances.

Holt-Robinson was placed into receivership in 1993, and a court-appointed examiner later found that Holt defrauded the bankruptcy estate of $385,000. Soundview Media Investments entered into an agreement to acquire WTWC and Holt-Robinson's other holding, WHHY-AM-FM radio in Montgomery, Alabama, for $7.1 million in 1994. This deal failed to close; instead, Guy Gannett Communications of Portland, Maine, acquired the station in 1996.

Guy Gannett put itself up for sale in 1998 because of a lack of interest by younger members of the Gannett family in the business; the five television stations were purchased by Sinclair Broadcast Group for $310 million.

In 2001, Media Ventures Management, the then-owner of ABC affiliate WTXL-TV, entered into a five-year outsourcing agreement with Sinclair to combine sales and operations staffs with WTWC-TV. WTXL staffers moved from that station's studios to WTWC-TV's facility in 2002. Media Ventures sold WTXL-TV to the Southern Broadcast Corporation (later known as Calkins Media) in 2005; the new management opted to operate independently, ended the operating agreement just shy of its five-year term in February 2006, and began plans for a new studio site.

On September 25, 2013, New Age Media (owner of then-Fox affiliate WTLH and operator of WTLF) announced that it would sell most of its stations to Sinclair; the buyer, however, could not acquire its Tallahassee stations directly. It was initially proposed that related company Cunningham Broadcasting acquire WTLH and Deerfield Media acquire WTLF, with Sinclair operating both shared services agreements. This acquisition languished at the FCC, and on October 31, 2014, New Age Media requested the dismissal of its application to sell WTLH; the next day, Sinclair purchased the non-license assets of WTLH and WTLF and began operating them through a master service agreement. At midnight on January 1, 2015, Sinclair moved the Fox affiliation to WTWC's second digital subchannel.

Newscasts
Compared with the market's other big three television stations, WTWC has never had much success operating a news department of its own.

Holt-Robinson launched the first attempt at a local news service on WTWC, News 40, on October 13, 1986. Within six months of the newscast's launch, WTWC-TV's general manager resigned; the female news anchor was dismissed because owner Holt had wanted a male solo anchor and only used a two-anchor format on the general manager's advice. By the start of 1988, only one original news presenter remained at the station; the station attracted six percent of the Leon County audience compared to 11 percent for WTXL and 72 percent for WCTV. The news department was ultimately axed in March 1991.

As soon as Guy Gannett announced its purchase of WTWC-TV, it declared its intention to add local newscasts. It hired away Mike Rucker, a longtime meteorologist at WCTV, from his position at the Florida Division of Emergency Management. NBC News 40 launched March 13, 1997. Despite the effort and challenging WTXL for second place, the news department lost money throughout its existence, and Sinclair shuttered it at the end of November 2000.

While the NBC channel still does not offer any local news, the Fox subchannel does under arrangements that predate Sinclair operation. In 2003, WTLH had partnered with WCTV for the latter to produce a 10 p.m. local newscast, a partnership that soon expanded to include an hour-long morning newscast at 7 a.m.

Subchannels
The station's digital signal is multiplexed:

References

External links
WTWC-TV "NBC 40"
WTWC-DT2 "Fox 49"
 Information on WTWC's Class A translators in Valdosta, Georgia (owned by New Age Media):
 WBFL-CD: , 
 WBVJ-CD: , 

Television channels and stations established in 1983
TWC-TV
NBC network affiliates
Fox network affiliates
Charge! (TV network) affiliates
Sinclair Broadcast Group
1983 establishments in Florida